Dr Dee: An English Opera is an opera created by theatre director Rufus Norris and musician and composer Damon Albarn. Its debut performance was at the Palace Theatre, Manchester in July 2011, as part of the 2011 Manchester International Festival. The opera is based on the life of John Dee, medical and scientific advisor to Elizabeth I.

Background

Damon Albarn became associated with the Manchester International Festival through a 2006 concert production by his band Gorillaz, Demon Days Live, a 2007 Chinese opera, Monkey: Journey to the West, and a 2009 immersive theatre production, It Felt Like a Kiss, for which he wrote music.

An opera titled Doctor Dee was originally planned as a collaboration between Albarn, Gorillaz partner Jamie Hewlett and comic book author Alan Moore. According to Moore, he was approached by Albarn and Hewlett to collaborate on an opera featuring superheroes, but instead he suggested John Dee as a subject. He withdrew from the project when expected contributions from Albarn and Hewlett to his magazine Dodgem Logic failed to materialise. Moore is credited for "inspiration" in the opera's official programme and his incomplete libretto was published in Strange Attractor magazine.

Production
Dr Dee ran from 1 to 9 July 2011 at the Palace Theatre, Manchester. It was commissioned by the Manchester International Festival, English National Opera and the London 2012 Festival. It was subsequently performed from 26 June to 7 July 2012 at the London Coliseum, as part of the London 2012 Festival.

The opera was scored for a band combining Elizabethan English instruments (viola da gamba, shawm, dulcian, crumhorn, recorder, lute) with the African kora and the distinctive drumming of Nigerian percussionist Tony Allen. Damon Albarn played acoustic guitar and harmonium and sang on a number of songs. A twenty-piece conventional orchestra was provided by the BBC Philharmonic and conducted by André de Ridder.

John Dee, a non-singing part, was played by Bertie Carvel. Dee's wife, Katherine, was played by Anna Dennis. Francis Walsingham was played by Steven Page. Edward Kelley was played by Christopher Robson, whose singing was described as "sublime" by Albarn.

Reception
The Guardian gave the Manchester production four stars, saying that it "reaches to the heart of the tragedy of an overreaching intellect destroyed by a deal with a second-rate Mephistopheles". The Independent also awarded four stars, saying that the production was "mostly a triumph, but the opening dumb show and final song don't work". Rupert Christiansen in The Daily Telegraph gave the same star-rating, describing the opera as "fresh, original and heartfelt". The NME described it as "visually sumptuous and musically haunting".

Soundtrack

Track listing

Personnel

 Damon Albarn – vocals, harmony vocals, backing vocals, acoustic guitar, producer, artwork

Production
 Stephen Sedgwick – engineer, recording
 Stephen Rinker – engineer
 Andre De Ridder – conductor
 Valgeir Sigurdsson – mixing
 Alexander Overington – assistant mixing
 Einar Stefannsson – assistant mixing
 Paul Evans – assistant mixing
 Tim Young – mastering

Additional musicians
 Tony Allen – drums
 Simon Tong – guitar
 Mike Smith – organ
 Arngeir Hauksson – theorbo
 Madou Diabate – kora
 Liam Byrne – viol
 Anne Allen – wind
 Bill Lyons – wind
 David Hatcher – wind
 Anna Dennis – vocals
 Bertie Carvel – vocals
 Christopher Robson – vocals
 Melanie Pappenheim – vocals
 Stephen Page – vocals
 Victoria Couper – vocals
 BBC Philharmonic
 Palace Voices – vocals

Other personnel
 Stephen Higgins – music supervisor
 Paul Arditti – recording consultant

References

External links
Production Images

2011 operas
2012 Cultural Olympiad
English-language operas
John Dee
Operas
Operas by Damon Albarn
Operas set in the 16th century
Operas set in England
Cultural depictions of physicians
Cultural depictions of British men
Operas based on real people
Opera recordings